The 37th Flying Training Squadron is part of the 14th Flying Training Wing based at Columbus Air Force Base, Mississippi.  It operates Beechcraft T-6 Texan II aircraft conducting flight training.

The squadron was first established as the 37th Pursuit Squadron and activated in January 1941.  As the 37th Fighter Squadron it saw combat during World War II in the Mediterranean and European Theaters, and was awarded a Distinguished Unit Citation for action over Austria in 1944.  It was inactivated after war's end in 1945.

The squadron was active with Air Defense Command in the northeastern United States from 1946 to 1949.  Originally equipped with propeller fighters, it became one of the first units equipped with the Republic F-84 Thunderjet.  As the 37th Fighter-Interceptor Squadron, the unit once again was assigned the mission of defending the northeastern United States from 1952 to 1960.

The squadron has conducted flying training since 1972 as the 37th Flying Training Squadron.

Mission
The 37th Flying Training Squadron conducts primary flight training in the T-6 Texan II. Seated with an instructor, each student receives about 81 hours of training in this aircraft. Students learn basic aircraft characteristics and control, takeoff and landing techniques, aerobatics, and night, instrument and formation flying. The 37th Flying Training Squadron is currently commanded by Lt Col Aaron Tillman. The 37th Flying Training Squadron Commander Spouse and Key Spouse Mentor is Mrs. Christina Tillman.

History
World War II
The 37th conducted air defense in the northwestern U.S. between 7 and 24 December 1941 then went on to fly combat missions in the European Theater of Operations and the Mediterranean Theater of Operations from 6 May 1943 to 4 May 1945.

The squadron was first activated as the 37th Pursuit Squadron in January 1941 at Hamilton Field, California. as one of the original squadrons of the 55th Pursuit Group. It moved to Portland Airport, Oregon in early June 1941.  The squadron trained with Republic P-43 Lancers until it received Lockheed P-38 Lightnings It deployed to Paine Field, Washington to fly patrols on the west coast of the US after the Japanese attack on Pearl Harbor.

The squadron converted to Lightnings in 1942.  In February 1943 it was detached from its parent group and deployed to North Africa, where it was assigned to the 14th Fighter Group the following month.  The 14th group had temporarily withdrawn from combat, with some of its men and planes being reassigned to the 1st and 82d Fighter Groups.

The squadron began combat operations in May, after being re-equipped with the P-38F and some P-38Gs. Already prior to the Axis defeat in Tunisia, the Northwest African Air Forces had begun preparations for the invasion of Sicily.  The 37th flew dive-bombing missions during the Allied assault on Pantelleria. It helped prepare for and support the invasions of Sicily and Italy.

The unit became part of Fifteenth Air Force in November 1943, and moved to Triolo Airfield, Italy. It engaged primarily in escort work flying missions to cover bombers engaged in long-range operations against strategic objectives in Italy, France, Germany, Czechoslovakia, Austria, Hungary, Yugoslavia, Rumania, and Bulgaria. On 2 April 1944, the squadron earned a Distinguished Unit Citation for beating off attacks by enemy fighters while escorting bombers attacking ball-bearing and aircraft production facilities at Steyr, Austria, enabling the bombers to strike their targets.

The squadron provided escort for reconnaissance operations, supported Operation Dragoon, the invasion of Southern France, in August 1944, and on numerous occasions flew long-range missions to strafe and dive-bomb motor vehicles, trains, bridges, supply areas, airdromes, and troop concentrations in an area extending from France to the Balkans. The 37th Fighter Squadron was inactivated in Italy on 9 September 1945. During its time in combat the 37th Fighter Squadron was credited with destroying 49.5 enemy aircraft in air-to-air combat.

Cold War air defense
Operations from Dow Air Force Base

The squadron was once more activated in the US on 20 November 1946 at Dow Field, Maine as part of the First Air Force of Air Defense Command (ADC).  The squadron was one of the first operational units assigned to ADC.

The 37th was initially equipped with Republic P-47N Thunderbolts and later with first-generation Republic P-84B Thunderjets. It was responsible for air defense of the Northeastern United States. In 1947, the units's parent group became the first in the AAF to equip with the P-84.

The 37th's mission was daylight and fair weather defense of northeast United States from New York City north to the Maine/New Brunswick border, shared with 52d Fighter Group (All-Weather) at Mitchel Air Force Base, New York which flew North American F-82 Twin Mustangs for night and inclement weather operations. The squadron was inactivated on 2 October 1949 due to budget cutbacks.

Operations from Ethan Allen Air Force Base

In late 1952, the squadron, now designated the 37th Fighter-Interceptor Squadron, was again activated under ADC and assigned to the 4711th Defense Wing.  It was stationed at Ethan Allen Air Force Base, Vermont, where it replaced the federalized 134th Fighter-Interceptor Squadron, which was returned to the control of the Vermont Air National Guard. The 37th took over the personnel, mission, and World War II era North American F-51D Mustang aircraft of the inactivating 134th.Cornett & Johnson, p. 115 The squadron was tasked with defending the New England area against the threat of manned bomber attacks.

In February 1953 the squadron converted to airborne intercept radar equipped and Mighty Mouse rocket armed North American F-86D Sabres. In the same month, ADC reorganized its dispersed fighter units, combining the fighter squadrons with support units into air defense groups.  As a result of this reorganization, the 517th Air Defense Group was formed at Ethan Allen and the squadron was assigned to it.

In August 1955 ADC implemented Project Arrow, which was designed to bring back on the active list the fighter units that had compiled memorable records in the two world wars. As part of this project, the squadron's headquarters of World War II was reactivated.  The 14th Fighter Group (Air Defense) assumed the mission, personnel, and equipment of the 517th Air Defense Group, which was simultaneously inactivated. The squadron upgraded to AIM-4 Falcon armed Convair F-102 Delta Daggers in December 1957. These aircraft were supersonic and equipped with data link for interception control through the Semi-Automatic Ground Environment system.  In June 1960, the Air Force terminated its active duty presence at Ethan Allen and the squadron and its parent group were inactivated.

Pilot Training
In 1972 Air Training Command began to replace its Major Command Controlled (MAJCON) flying training units with Air Force Controlled (AFCON) units.  Unlike MAJCON units, which could not carry a permanent history or lineage, AFCON units can continue the lineage and history of earlier units.  The squadron was redesignated the 37th Flying Training Squadron and absorbed the mission, personnel, and equipment of the 3650th Pilot Training Squadron which was inactivated.  The 37th has provided Undergraduate Pilot Training since 1 June 1972.  It presently conducts primary flight training in the T-6 Texan II.  Students receive about 81 hours of training in this aircraft. Students learn basic aircraft characteristics and control, takeoff and landing techniques, aerobatics, and night, instrument and formation flying.

Lineage
 Constituted as the 37th Pursuit Squadron (Interceptor) on 20 November 1940
 Activated on 15 January 1941
 Redesignated 37th Pursuit Squadron (Interceptor) (Twin Engine) on 20 November 1940
 Redesignated 37th Fighter Squadron (Twin Engine) on 15 May 1942
 Redesignated 37th Fighter Squadron, Two Engine on 28 February 1944
 Inactivated on 9 September 1945
 Activated on 20 November 1946
 Inactivated on 2 October 1949
 Redesignated 37th Fighter-Interceptor Squadron on 11 September 1952
 Activated on 1 November 1952
 Discontinued on 1 May 1960
 Redesignated 37th Flying Training Squadron' on 22 March 1972
 Activated on 1 June 1972.

Assignments
 55th Pursuit Group (later 55th Fighter Group), 15 January 1941
 14th Fighter Group, 1 March 1943 – 9 September 1945
 14th Fighter Group, 20 November 1946 – 2 October 1949
 4711th Defense Wing 1 November 1952
 517th Air Defense Group, 16 February 1953
 14th Fighter Group (Air Defense), 18 August 1955 – 1 May 1960
 14th Flying Training Wing, 1 June 1972
 14th Operations Group, 15 December 1991–.

Stations
 Hamilton Field, California, 15 January 1941
 Portland Airport, Oregon, 21 May 1941
 Operated from Paine Field, Washington, 7 December 1941 – 24 December 1941
 Olympia Army Airfield, Washington, 24 December 1941
 McChord Field, Washington, 8 January 1943 – 18 January 1943
 La Senia Airfield, Algeria, 27 February 1943
 Mediouna Airfield, French Morocco, c. 17 March 1943
 Telergma Airfield, Algeria, 5 May 1943
 El Bathan Airfield, Tunisia, 4 July 1943
 Sainte Marie du Zit Airfield, Tunisia, 26 July 1943
 Triolo Airfield, Italy, 12 December 1943
 Operated from Corsica, 10 August 1944 – 21 August 1944
 Lesina Airfield, Italy, September 1945 – 9 September 1945
 Dow Field (later Dow Air Force Base), Maine, 20 November 1946 – 2 October 1949
 Ethan Allen Air Force Base, Vermont, 1 November 1952 – 1 May 1960
Columbus Air Force Base, Mississippi 1 June 1972 – present

Aircraft

 Republic P-43 Lancer (1941–1942)
 Lockheed P-38 Lightning (1942–1945)
 Republic P-47 Thunderbolt (1946–1949)
 Republic P-84 (later F-84) Thunderjet (1947–1949)
 North American F-51D Mustang (1952–1953)
 North American F-86D Sabre (1953–1958)
 Convair F-102 Delta Dagger (1957–1960)
T-37 Tweet (1972–2008)
T-6 Texan II ( – Present)

Awards and campaigns

References

 Notes

 Citations

Bibliography

 
 
 
 
 
 Newton, Wesley P., Jr. and Senning, Calvin F., (1963)  USAF Credits for the Destruction of  Enemy Aircraft, World War II, USAF Historical Study No. 85

Further reading
 
 

Military units and formations in Mississippi
0037